Theresa Creek may refer to:

 Theresa Creek, Queensland, a locality in the Central Highlands Region, Australia
 Clermont, Queensland, town in Central Highlands Region, Australia, formerly known as Theresa Creek